Pärnu Beach is a beach of Pärnu Bay, administratively in Pärnu, Estonia. In a sunny summer day, tens of thousand sunbathers and swimmers visit the beach.

In the beach, there are, for example, swings, surfing equipment rental, mini golf area. Also Rannahotell Pärnu is located on the beach.

References

Beaches of Estonia
Pärnu